The PR2 mixed double sculls competition at the 2022 World Rowing Championships took place at the Račice regatta venue.

Schedule
The schedule was as follows:

All times are Central European Summer Time (UTC+2)

Results

Heats
The two fastest boats in each heat advanced directly to the Final A. The remaining boats were sent to the repechages.

Heat 1

Heat 2

Repechage
The two fastest boats in heat advanced to the Final A. The remaining boats were sent to the Final B.

Finals
The A final determined the rankings for places 1 to 6. Additional rankings were determined in the other finals.

Final B

Final A

References

2022 World Rowing Championships